Hwang Sun-Il  ; born July 29, 1984) is a South Korean football player who currently plays for Korea National League side Chungju Hummel FC. Hwang previously played for Ulsan Hyundai.

References

1984 births
Living people
South Korean footballers
Ulsan Hyundai FC players
Chungju Hummel FC players
K League 1 players
Korea National League players
Association football midfielders